

Prana Dance is a studio album by American jazz musician Tom Harrell, released on January 27, 2009, by HighNote Records and recorded on May 29, 2008, and June 10, 2008. Down Beat magazine praised the album stating that it "signals a new career high" and added, "Music that operates at this level of structural, emotional and psychic integration is rare."

Track listing
All songs by Tom Harrell.

Personnel
Credits adapted from AllMusic.

 Tom Harrell – trumpet, flugelhorn, producer 
 Wayne Escoffery – soprano and tenor saxophones, producer
 Danny Grissett – piano, Fender Rhodes
 Ugonna Okegwo – bass
 Johnathan Blake – drums
 Joe Fields – executive producer
 Angela Harrell – producer
 Dave Kowalski – engineer
 Neil Tesse – liner notes

References

External links 

2009 albums
Tom Harrell albums
HighNote Records albums